1,2-Bis(dimethylphosphino)ethane (dmpe) is a diphosphine ligand in coordination chemistry. It is a colorless, air-sensitive liquid that is soluble in organic solvents.  With the formula (CHPMe), dmpe is used as a compact strongly basic spectator ligand (Me = methyl),  Representative complexes include V(dmpe)(BH), Mn(dmpe)(AlH), Tc(dmpe)(CO)Cl, and Ni(dmpe)Cl.

Synthesis
It is synthesised by the reaction of methylmagnesium iodide with 1,2-bis(dichlorophosphino)ethane:
ClPCHCHPCl  +  4 MeMgI   →   MePCHCHPMe  +  4 MgICl
Alternatively it can be generated by alkylation of sodium dimethylphosphide.

The synthesis of dmpe from thiophosphoryl chloride has led to serious accidents and has been abandoned.

Related ligands
 Bis(dicyclohexylphosphino)ethane, a bulkier analogue, which is also a solid.
 1,2-Bis(diphenylphosphino)ethane, more air-stable than dmpe,  but less basic.
 1,2-Bis(dimethylphosphino)benzene, a more rigid analogue of dmpe.
 Tetramethylethylenediamine, the diamine analogue of dmpe.

References 

Chelating agents
Diphosphines
1,2-Ethanediyl compounds